Indian Beauty (released in the United States as On the Other Side) is a 2006 Indian romance film directed by Shanti Kumar. Shot in Telugu and English, the film features  Collin Mcgee, Shaila Rao, and Manish Dayal.

Plot
Indian culture interests Dave (Colin McGee). So he decides to work on its culture. Dave has a friend Jack (Manish Dayal) who is born in America but has roots in India. Jack joins Dave on his project on Indian culture. Mr. Murthy, a friend of Jack's father, offers them a place to stay. Initially Mr. and Mrs. Murthy are keen on taking Jack as their son-in-law, but noticing his American ways they prefer a local boy Vishal (Gopichand Lagadapati).

Mr. Murthy's daughter, Swapna, is also interested in Indian culture and hence decides to help Dave with his project. In the process of working both Swapna & Dave are attracted to each other before they finally fall in love. Whether Swapna & Dave finally are successful in convincing the parents forms rest of the story.

Cast

 Collin Mcgee as Dave
 Saila Rao as Swapna 
 Manish Dayal as Jayakrishna alias Jack
 Tanikella Bharani as himself
 Bramhanandam as himself
 Susan Slatin as Dave's grandmother
 Nakuul Mehta as Shekhar
 Gopichand Lagadapati as Vishal
 Jayalalita as herself
 Nagineedu as Vishal's father
 Sukruta Shankar as Radha

Production
The producer and director of the film, Shanti Kumar, selected Collin and Sai Rao (granddaughter of Anjali) for the lead roles along with Manish Dayal. The film was released in the United States under the title On the Other Side. The film was selected as the best movie of the year 2007 at Harlem International Film Festival New York.

Soundtrack
The songs are composed by Joy Kelvin.

Critical reception

The film received average reviews from the critics.

Now Running wrote, "On the whole an enjoyable fare that is bound to be helpful to people justifying their cross cultural marriages."

One India wrote: "It is a film worth watching by one and all. However, the commercial values in the film are a little less. But a film that could be watched together by the entire family."

References

External links
 

2006 films
Indian romance films
2000s romance films
2000s Telugu-language films